Claverol is a hamlet located in the municipality of Conca de Dalt, in Province of Lleida province, Catalonia, Spain. As of 2020, it has a population of 26.

Geography 
Claverol is located 109km north-northeast of Lleida.

References

Populated places in the Province of Lleida